The Leitrim Intermediate Football Championship is an annual football competition contested by mid-tier Leitrim GAA clubs. The Leitrim County Board of the Gaelic Athletic Association has organised it since 1928.

The trophy presented to the winners is the ? Dromahair are the title holders (2021) defeating in the Final.

Qualification for subsequent competitions

Connacht Intermediate Club Football Championship
The Leitrim IFC winner qualifies for the Connacht Intermediate Club Football Championship. It is the only team from County Leitrim to qualify for this competition. The Leitrim IFC winner enters the Connacht Intermediate Club Football Championship at the quarter-final stage.

All-Ireland Intermediate Club Football Championship
The Leitrim IFC winner — by winning the Connacht Intermediate Club Football Championship — may qualify for the All-Ireland Intermediate Club Football Championship, at which it would enter at the semi-final stage, providing it hasn't been drawn to face the British champions in the quarter-finals.

Wins listed by club

References

Intermediate Gaelic football county championships
Leitrim GAA club championships